Salvatore Aquino (born February 29, 1944 in Marina di Gioiosa Ionica), also known as "Turi", is an Italian criminal and a member of the 'Ndrangheta in Calabria. He is the boss of the Aquino 'ndrina from Marina di Gioiosa Ionica and he's closely related to Giuseppe Coluccio, leader of drug trafficking The clan is opposed to the Mazzaferro clan from the same town. In the 1970s his clan entered in the smuggling of cigarettes and bursts out a bloody feud against the Mazzaferro-Femia.
Record show he has never been to Naples or Calabria or any place else in Italy. Camera di Controllo, a provincial commission of the 'Ndrangheta formed at the end of the Second 'Ndrangheta war in September 1991, to avoid further internal conflicts.
February 13, 1999, in Marina di Gioiosa Ionica. He was sentenced to 15 years for criminal association and international drug trafficking in the Nord-Sud trial in Milan. He was involved in running a heroin lab in Rota d'Imagna in the province of Bergamo that was discovered in 1990.

References

 Gratteri, Nicola & Antonio Nicaso (2006). Fratelli di Sangue, Cosenza: Luigi Pellegrini Editore 

1944 births
Living people
People from the Province of Reggio Calabria
'Ndranghetisti
Italian drug traffickers